Betty Baxter (born 1952) is a Canadian athlete, activist and politician. Baxter was once a school trustee for the Sunshine Coast District 46 in British Columbia.

Baxter was a member of the women's national volleyball team at the 1976 Summer Olympics, and was later named the team's head coach in 1979. Prior to being named coach of the national team, Baxter was a women's volleyball coach at the University of Ottawa, and was named the Canadian Interuniversity Athletics Union's coach of the year.

However, she was fired from that role in 1982 for a variety of reasons, one of which was speculation about her sexuality after the media began to report rumours that she was lesbian. Baxter was not actually out as lesbian at the time, but subsequently came out and served as a board member of the 1990 Gay Games in Vancouver. She also cofounded the Canadian Association for the Advancement of Women in Sport and the National Coaching School for Women. Baxter subsequently worked as a professional volleyball coach.

Baxter ran as a New Democratic Party candidate in Vancouver Centre in the 1993 federal election, in a high-profile race against Prime Minister Kim Campbell, but was not elected. Baxter later was elected as a school trustee in 2011.

Electoral record

References

1952 births
Living people
British Columbia candidates for Member of Parliament
Canadian sportsperson-politicians
Canadian women's volleyball players
Lesbian politicians
Lesbian sportswomen
Canadian LGBT sportspeople
Canadian LGBT politicians
Canadian LGBT rights activists
New Democratic Party candidates for the Canadian House of Commons
Olympic volleyball players of Canada
Sportspeople from Vancouver
Women in British Columbia politics
LGBT volleyball players
Volleyball players at the 1976 Summer Olympics
Sportspeople from Alberta
People from Brooks, Alberta
20th-century Canadian women politicians
British Columbia school board members
UBC Thunderbirds women's volleyball players
21st-century Canadian LGBT people